2020 Iowa Question 1, the Iowa Constitutional Convention Question, was a ballot measure in Iowa held on November 3, 2020, to hold a constitutional convention to revise the Constitution of Iowa. It was defeated with 70% of the vote against.

Background
The Iowa Constitution specifies that there should be a ballot measure asking if there should be a constitutional convention every ten years.

Contents
The measure appeared on ballots as follows, as the Iowa Constitution requires:

Results

References

Question 1
Iowa Question 1
Iowa ballot measures
Constitutional convention ballot measures in the United States